Thomas Allen (born October 21, 1998) is an American college basketball player for the NC State Wolfpack of the Atlantic Coast Conference (ACC). He previously played for the Nebraska Cornhuskers.

High school career

Recruiting
Allen was one of the nation's top high school shooters and was a consensus top-100 recruit for the class of 2018. A four-star prospect by ESPN, Scout and Rivals, Allen was rated the No. 9 prospect in New England by the New England Recruiting Report. He received offers from Campbell, Cincinnati, East Carolina, George Mason, High Point,  Illinois, James Madison, Monmouth, Murray State, N.C. State, North Dakota, Nebraska, Ohio State, Old Dominion, Rhode Island, Saint Louis, Tennessee, Texas A&M, VCU, Virginia Tech, and Xavier. After official visits to N.C. State, Nebraska, and Saint Louis, Allen committed to N.C. State on October 2, 2016. On February 18, 2017, N.C. State announced head coach Mark Gottfried would not be retained following the 2016–17 season. Allen was granted his release on March 29, 2017, and decided to re-open his recruitment. Despite picking up a late offer from Kansas, Allen committed to Nebraska on April 21, 2017.

College career
Allen started the 2017–18 season coming off the bench for the Cornhuskers. On December 16, 2017, Allen scored a career-high 13 points (3–4 behind the arc) in 14 minutes against Kansas. He averaged 3.2 points per game as a freshman.

As a sophomore, Allen averaged 8.7 points, two assists and 1.3 steals per game. He injured his ankle on February 28, 2019, in a loss to Michigan forcing him to miss the rest of the season. Following the season, Allen announced he was transferring to NC State.

Allen averaged 7.4 points, 2.6 rebounds and 1.6 assists per game as a junior. He suffered an ankle injury in a loss to Duke on February 13, 2021, ending his season.

Career statistics

College

|-
| style="text-align:left;"| 2017–18
| style="text-align:left;"| Nebraska
| 32 || 0 || 9.9 || .395 || .354 || .800 || 1.0 || .5 || .2 || .0 || 3.2
|-
| style="text-align:left;"| 2018–19
| style="text-align:left;"| Nebraska
| 29 || 25 || 30.2 || .436 || .364 || .862 || 2.8 || 2.0 || 1.3 || .2 || 8.7
|-
| style="text-align:left;"| 2019–20
| style="text-align:left;"| NC State
| style="text-align:center;" colspan="11"|  Redshirt
|-
| style="text-align:left;"| 2020–21
| style="text-align:left;"| NC State
| 17 || 15 || 26.5 || .364 || .379 || .789 || 2.5 || 1.6 || 1.3 || .1 || 7.4
|- class="sortbottom"
| style="text-align:center;" colspan="2"| Career
| 78 || 40 || 21.1 || .408 || .366 || .824 || 2.0 || 1.3 || .9 || .1 || 6.2

Personal life
Thomas is the son of Clarence and Tonya Simmons. He has one brother, Brandon Smith, and three sisters, Deshadia Allen, Tashari Allen and Racquel Simmons. Thomas is a marketing major at Nebraska.

References

External links
NC State Wolfpack bio
Nebraska Cornhuskers bio

1998 births
Living people
American men's basketball players
Basketball players from Raleigh, North Carolina
Nebraska Cornhuskers men's basketball players
Shooting guards